Connie Kreski (September 19, 1946 – March 21, 1995) was born Constance Joanne Kornacki. She was an American model and actress. In January 1968, Kreski posed in the centerfold as Playboy magazine's Playmate of the Month. She subsequently won Playmate of the Year honors for 1969. She was also Miss January 1969 in the Playboy calendar for that year and featured again in the 1970 calendar. Kreski briefly worked as a psychiatric nurse at a hospital in Ann Arbor, Michigan before being discovered at a University of Michigan football game by a Playboy scout .

Career
In April 1969, Kreski was signed by Anthony Newley to play the female lead in the Universal Pictures film Can Heironymus Merkin Ever Forget Mercy Humppe and Find True Happiness? The movie was shot in Malta and starred Milton Berle, Joan Collins, and George Jessel. She also appeared in The Trackers, (1971), The Outside Man (1972), and The Black Bird (1975).

In Europe, Kreski also got a name for being photographed by Frank Habicht. This German photographer memorably recorded Swinging London, including the time Kreski lived there.

Personal life
Los Angeles Times writer Joyce Haber mentioned Kreski in a newspaper column just days after the murder of Sharon Tate by followers of Charles Manson. Kreski was a member of the murdered actress's social circle, and considered Sharon Tate, who was quite similar in physical appearance, a very close friend. Kreski was among those invited to the mansion Tate shared with her husband, director Roman Polanski, on the fatal night of August 9, 1969. Kreski penned an article for the Detroit Free Press discussing her immediate reaction to the death of Tate roughly a week after the incident.

Death
Kreski died of a blocked carotid artery on March 21, 1995, in Beverly Hills, California.

Film and television appearances
 Lost Flight (1969) - Australian's Wife
 Can Hieronymus Merkin Ever Forget Mercy Humppe and Find True Happiness? (1969) - Mercy Humppe
 Ironside (1969) – "A Matter of Love and Death" as Arlene
 The Bold Ones - Waitress (one episode, 1969)
 Love, American Style  (1970) TV episode - "Love and the V.I.P. Restaurant"
 The Trackers (1971, TV) - Becky Paxton
 The Outside Man (1972) - Rosie
 The Black Bird (1975) - Decoy Girl
 Captains and the Kings (1976) TV miniseries - Pearl Gray
 Aspen (1977, TV miniseries) - Jackie Camerovsky

See also
 List of people in Playboy 1960–1969

References
Burlington, North Carolina, "She's on Her Way to Stardom, But Mom's on Tranqulizers", April 30, 1969, Page 58.
Florence, South Carolina Morning News, "Star Chat, Tough Talk from James Caan", January 6, 1974, Page 44.
Los Angeles Times, Movie Call Sheet, April 15, 1968, Page C21.
Los Angeles Times, "Venus of the Centerfold", July 13, 1969, Page K22.
Los Angeles Times, "Playmate of the Year Ceremonies Present", May 15, 1969, Page D21.
Los Angeles Times, "Living in Era of Uncommon Barbarity", August 12, 1969, Page C11.
Los Angeles Times, "Lived The Part, How James Caan Became Godson", May 30, 1972, Page G1.
 Photobook: 'As it was, frank habicht's sixties'. Edited by Hatje Cantz Verlag, Berlin, in 2018. ISBN 978-3-7757-4490-4.

External links
 

1946 births
1995 deaths
People from Beverly Hills, California
People from Wyandotte, Michigan
1960s Playboy Playmates
Playboy Playmates of the Year
Deaths from lung cancer in California